Mount Ellis Academy is a co-educational private high school (grades 9 through 12) located about  east of Bozeman, Montana, United States.

Founded in 1902, Mt. Ellis Academy includes boys and girls dormitories, an Administration building, gymnasium, and other facilities. The academy sits on a  campus.

During peak years in the 1960s, Mt. Ellis had nearly 200 students.  In recent decades enrollment has trended downward and stood at about 70 students for the 2005- 2006 school year.   According to a 2001 report, out of over 100 private schools in Montana, Mount Ellis was one of only ten accredited under state education standards.

Mt Ellis Academy is sponsored by the Seventh-day Adventist Church and is part of the Montana Conference of Seventh-day Adventists.
It is a part of the Seventh-day Adventist education system, the world's second largest Christian school system.

Academics
The required curriculum includes classes in the following subject areas: Religion, English, Oral Communications, Social Studies, Mathematics, Science, Physical Education, Health, Computer Applications, Fine Arts, and Electives.

The school offers a number of elective classes, such as Wood Shop, Art, Metal Shop, Auto Shop, Personal Finance, Home Economics, Leadership, Soccer, Volleyball, Basketball, Handbells, Choir, and Strings.
Life Time activities offered include Skiing/snowboarding, Rock Climbing, and Disc Golf.

Spiritual aspects
All students take religion classes each year that they are enrolled. These classes cover topics in biblical history and Christian and denominational doctrines. Instructors in other disciplines also begin each class period with prayer or a short devotional thought, many which encourage student input. Weekly, the entire student body gathers together in the auditorium for an hour-long chapel service.
Outside the classrooms there is year-round spiritually oriented programming that relies on student involvement.

Kohl's Cares Win
In 2010, Kohl's started a Facebook contest for schools in the US to win $500,000. Mt. Ellis Academy entered this contest and came out in 10th place with 144,006 votes. After the authentication of votes process, they were in 9th place. Part of the campaign for votes was the saying, "Vote for our Sewers!" coming from the fact they planned to use the $500,000 to upgrade their 1950s era sewer system.  At the Academy and in the Church, this is spoken of as a miracle.

See also

 List of Seventh-day Adventist secondary schools
 Seventh-day Adventist education

References

External links 

Buildings and structures in Bozeman, Montana
Private high schools in Montana
Adventist secondary schools in the United States
Education in Gallatin County, Montana